Pavel Pinni (born 5 December 1950) is a Slovenian former football manager.

Career

Pinni started his managerial career with Slovenian side Gorica (Slovenia), helping them win 3 consecutive league titles and the 2001–02 Slovenian Football Cup.

References

External links
 

1950 births
Living people
ND Gorica managers
NK Celje managers
Slovenian football managers
Slovenian footballers